Kiana and Qiana may refer to:

Places 
Kiana, Alaska
Kiana, South Australia

People 
Kiana Brown (born 1997), American singer
Kiana Danial (born 1984), Iranian author
Kiana Davenport (born 1940), American author
Kiana Eide (born 1998), American group rhythmic gymnast 
Kiana Elliott (1997), Australian female weightlifter
Kiana Firouz (born 1983), Iranian writer
Kiana Johnson (born 1993), American professional basketball player
Kiana Palacios (born 1996), Mexican footballer
Kiana Takairangi (born 1992), New Zealand rugby league footballer
Kiana Tom (born 1965), American exercise instructor and actress
Kiana Valenciano (born 1992), Filipino singer
Kiana Weber (born 1990), American violinist
Qiana Joseph (born 2001), West Indian cricketer

Other 
Kiana (band), a Finnish melodic death metal band
Kiana (singer), a Swedish singer
Qiana, silky nylon fabric developed by DuPont and heavily marketed in the 1970s

See also 
Kianna